The 2021–22 UAE Pro League will be the 47th edition of the UAE Pro League. Al Jazira are the defending champions after clinching their third title in the final day of last season. Al Ain would win its fourteenth title after beating the defending champions Al Jazira 5–0 the eleventh of May.

Teams

Team changes

Promoted to the Pro League
Both Al Urooba and Emirates secured promotion on the same day after beating Al Dhaid 3–0 and Masafi 6–0 on the second last matchday. Emirates is returning after getting relegated two seasons ago in 2018–19 season meanwhile Al Urooba is getting promoted back to the top tier after almost three decades of absence, only previously being in the competition in 1992–93 season.

Relegated to the First Division
On 7 May, despite winning 4–0 against Kalba, Hatta was confirmed relegated back to the First Division after only spending two seasons on the top flight.
On 11 May, Fujairah got relegated after a 2–1 defeat to Ajman, both clubs were battling relegation and needed a victory.

Stadia and locations

Note: Table lists clubs in alphabetical order.

Personnel and kits

Note: Flags indicate national team as has been defined under FIFA eligibility rules. Players may hold more than one non-FIFA nationality.

Foreign players
All teams could register as many foreign players as they want, but could only register four professional players in the roster.

Players name in bold indicates the player is registered during the mid-season transfer window.
Players in italics were out of the squad or left the club within the season, after the pre-season transfer window, or in the mid-season transfer window, and at least had one appearance.

Managerial changes

Notes
1. Caretaker

League table

Results

Seasonal statistics

Positions by round

Top scorers

Top assists

Clean sheets

Hat-tricks

Notes
(H) – Home team(A) – Away team

Awards

Number of teams by Emirates

References

UAE Pro League seasons
1
UAE